α-Carotene (alpha-carotene) is a form of carotene with a β-ionone ring at one end and an α-ionone ring at the opposite end. It is the second most common form of carotene.

Human physiology
In American and Chinese adults, the mean concentration of serum α-carotene was 4.71 μg/dL. Including 4.22 μg/dL among men and 5.31 μg/dL among women.

Dietary sources
The following vegetables are rich in alpha-carotene:
 Yellow-orange vegetables : Carrots (the main source for U.S. adults), Sweet potatoes, Pumpkin, Winter squash
 Dark-green vegetables : Broccoli, Green beans, Green peas, Spinach, Turnip greens, Collards, Leaf lettuce, Avocado

References

Carotenoids
Tetraterpenes
Cyclohexenes
Vitamin A